Lórien or Lorien may refer to:

J. R. R. Tolkien's legendarium
 Lothlórien, a forest realm in Middle-earth described in The Lord of the Rings
 Gardens of Lórien, the realm of the Vala Irmo in Valinor
 Lórien (Vala), the usual name for Irmo himself

Other uses
 Lorien (Babylon 5), a character from the science-fiction TV series Babylon 5
 Lórien (indie rock), an American independent rock band
 Lorien Novalis School a Waldorf school in Australia
 Lorien (Hambach Forest), a former tree-house colony by environmental activists in the Hambach Forest, Germany
 A fictional planet in the book series Lorien Legacies by Pittacus Lore